Tripuranthaka Swamy Temple is a Hindu temple located in the Tiruvallur district of Tamil Nadu, India. The presiding deity is Shiva.

Speciality
It is one of the shrines of the 275 Paadal Petra Sthalams.

References 

 

Padal Petra Stalam
Shiva temples in Tiruvallur district